Jesús Valle Choque or Willyan Jesús Paye Choque  (born July 25, 2000), known by his stage name Faraón Love Shady, is a Peruvian rapper, singer, songwriter, and Internet celebrity. He is noted for his extravagant dressing style and for writing songs that contain sexually explicit lyrics. He started as an influencer posting vlogs on his social media and later debuted in music with his first single "Sin condón".

Biography

2000–2019: Early life and music debut 
Jesús Paye Amaru was born on July 25, 2000, in Arequipa, Peru, the third of seven siblings and the son of farming parents. He worked as a street vendor of different products and got on the buses to sing, as a source of work.

Under the pseudonym of Faraón Love Shady, he began creating content on his social networks, mainly making challenges and video blogs of his life in Arequipa. His rise to fame at this stage is due to the fact that the Peruvian YouTuber Andynsane published a video about him. Jesús was presented as the "replacement for Tapir 590".

In August 2019, he debuted in music with his first single "Sin condón". In November 2019, he released his second single "Panocha", which was more successful and managed to position itself in YouTube trends in Peru.

2020–2021: "Panocha Remix" and viral explosion 
In June 2020, he publishes "Panocha Remix" in collaboration with Puerto Rican singers Jon Z and Ele A el Dominio. That same month, he released for Bolivian singer Qmayb the single "Una cunumi (Remix)" featuring J Gonzo, Ose, and Xvideo Token; and "Por el asterisco" with Puerto Rican rapper Kevvo.

In August 2020, he released his most popular song on YouTube "Oh me vengo", with which he again ranked first in trends on YouTube in Peru and in four days reached the figure of one million views. That same month he released "Soy guapo". These two songs were the first he made with the record label Híbrido Gang Music, whose name alludes to what he calls his fans, "híbrido gang".

After the growth of his popularity, Love Shady was interviewed by media such as Trap House Latino, La Zona, and Billboard Argentina. In November 2020, he was invited to the América Televisión TV show El reventonazo de la chola, where he performed the song "Ponte mascarilla" with Peruvian singer La Tigresa del Oriente. Later, he participated in Trap Live Peru 2020, a virtual concert produced by Blackstar Records.

In July 2021 he released "Duro 2 Horas Remix" featuring American-Uruguayan comedian and musician El Bananero.

In September 2021, he published "Gamer Over Fantasmay", a diss directed to Argentine rapper Zaramay. Previously, both had discrepancies in social networks. The video clip on YouTube managed to enter the list of trends in Peru, Argentina, and other Spanish-speaking countries.

2022–present: "Freestyle Session #13: RIP resentido" and concerts 

In February 2022, he announces a tour of Mexico that includes presentations in Playa del Carmen, Cancún, Mexico City, Guadalajara , and Monterrey, during March month. However, the concerts were delayed until June, and some of them were canceled.

In April 2022, he premiered his second diss, against the Puerto Rican rapper Residente, entitled "Freestyle Session #13: RIP resentido". The song generated a great impact on Internet, the video exceeded the figure of one million views in less than a day and ranked number one in YouTube trends. The context of the tiraera originates from the controversy between Residente and Colombian singer J Balvin, and, with it, the launch of "BZRP Music Sessions #49". Love Shady previously demonstrated his disagreement with Residente and his support for Balvin through stories on his Instagram account. Regarding the song, in an Instagram post where Faraón promotes the single, Residente commented: "You're the best. I'm your fan. Keep hitting it hard and writing", to which Jesús replied: "Residente, thanks. Since you're wearing the 'R' I await your answer. This is resolved in the booth", followed by a story: "Thanks for accepting it, it's good to add one more fan, I've always hit him hard and that's only 13% of my potential."

In May 2022, he performed a concert in Arequipa, his hometown, being his first concert in 2 years; followed by other presentations in Cochabamba, Chiclayo, Juliaca, Tingo María, Lima, Trujillo, Piura, and Tacna.

In November 2022 he is announced as one of the artists present at the Electric Daisy Carnival electronic music festival, which will take place in February 2023 in Mexico.

Musical style and influences 
Faraón described himself as El Dios del Trap ("The God of Trap") and El Dios de la Versatilidad ("The God of Versatility"). His fans are known as "hibrído gang". His videos show him with different necklaces that attract the attention of the public, including many mocking reactions.

Faraón cites American Reggaetón and trap singer Tekashi 6ix9ine as his favorite singer and has publicly expressed his support for 6ix9ine being released from jail. In addition, his hair highlights show great admiration for the artist. While many of his songs include sexually explicit lyrics, he has avoided lyrics that explicitly objectify or disrespect women. Faraón has stated that his music and lyrics are sexually explicit and "women shouldn't be offended because it is aimed at hot women who like to be talked dirty to," according to him, "that turns them on". His songs often speak of relationships and heartbreaks, inspired by what other artists are doing and what his audience wants.

As the Colombian singer J Balvin describes, "What do I think of Faraón Love Shady? It seems to me that he is a person who represents his country, in his own way and in his own style, each person has their or way of doing things."

Discography

Singles

As lead artist

As featured artist

Awards and nominations

Notes

References

External links 

 
 
 Faraón Love Shady on Instagram
 Faraón Love Shady on Facebook

2000 births
Living people
21st-century Peruvian male singers
21st-century Peruvian singers
Internet memes
Internet memes introduced in 2019
Latin trap musicians
People from Arequipa
Peruvian composers
Peruvian male composers
Peruvian singer-songwriters
Reggaeton musicians